William Hodges was an English painter.

William Hodges may also refer to:

William Terrell Hodges (born 1934), American judge
ARP Warden William Hodges, Dad's Army character
Sir William Hodges, 1st Baronet (1645–1714), English merchant and politician
William Hodges (judge) (1808–1868), English barrister, legal writer and chief justice of Cape colony
William Hodges (priest) (died 1684), Anglican priest
William H. Hodges (born 1929), retired Virginia Court of Appeals judge and state legislator
Bill Hodges (born 1943), former basketball coach

See also
William Hodge (1874–1932), American director, producer, performer and writer
William Hodge (footballer) (1904–?), Scottish footballer
Hodges (disambiguation)